'Grasp a Dream' was a short television program series broadcast by Phoenix Television in Hong Kong. It was broadcast from Monday to Friday, with each episode lasting 4 minutes. It followed the stories of people with dreams with the aim to encourage more people to follow their dreams.

References

Phoenix Television original programming